Sir Cheney Culpeper (1601–1663) was an English landowner, a supporter of Samuel Hartlib, and a largely non-political figure of his troubled times, interested in technological progress and reform. His sister Judith was the second wife of John Colepeper, 1st Baron Colepeper.

Landowner
He was the eldest son of Sir Thomas Colepeper of Hollingbourne,  Kent and Elizabeth Cheney of  Guestling, Sussex. After legal training, he was knighted in 1628. He had an estate at Great Wigsell, which he bought from his brother-in-law Lord Colepeper, but had possession of it only briefly. He bought in 1650 Elmley, Worcestershire. He lived mainly at Leeds Castle, which his father had purchased for his sons in 1632. Being later disinherited by his father, he became heavily indebted. During the English Civil War, he was a convinced 
Parliamentarian, unlike his father who was a staunch Royalist, and sat on the County Committee for Sequestration. This clash of opinions no doubt explains his father's decision to disinherit him. He never regained possession of his estates, and died a ruined man only a year after his father.

Family 

He married his cousin Elizabeth Stede, daughter of Sir John Stede of Harrietsham (the common ancestor was Joan Pordage, who married firstly William Stede and secondly Francis Colepeper). They had two surviving daughters, Cicely, who married William Cage (died 1676) of Milgate House, Thurnham, a lawyer, by whom she was the mother of the politician William Cage (died 1738), and Elizabeth, fourth wife of Christopher Milles of Herne Bay. Elizabeth was still alive in 1710, when we find her corresponding with her cousin, the writer Elizabeth Freke (who was the daughter of Sir Cheney's sister, the elder Cecily).

Hartlib circle

Of the Hartlibians, he had most to do with Benjamin Worsley. He was interested in alchemy, but most of all in agricultural topics. While on the Parliamentarian side, he was a moderate, against the more theocratic tendencies. He had contacts in Parliament; but insufficient influence to make a real difference to the attitude to Hartlib's projects.

References
 Stephen Clucas, The correspondence of a XVII-century 'chymical gentleman': Sir Cheney Culpeper and the chemical interests of the Hartlib circle. Ambix 40, 1993. p147-170
M. J. Braddick and M. Greengrass, editors, The Letters of Sir Cheney Culpepper 1641-1657 edited by in Seventeenth Century Political and Financial Papers, Camden Fifth Series volume 7 (1997)

Notes

External links
Culpepper Connections! The Culpepper Family History Site: Sir Cheney Culpeper of Leeds Castle 1601-1663 (biography)
Stirnet Ltd: Families Database: Colepeper3

1601 births
1663 deaths
English alchemists
Alumni of Hart Hall, Oxford
English landowners
17th-century alchemists